Metal–organic biohybrids (MOBs) are a family of materials containing a metal component, such as copper, and a biological component, such as the amino acid dimer cystine.  One of the MOB families first described was the copper-high aspect ratio structure called CuHARS.  Scanning electron microscopy (SEM) and transmission electron microscopy (TEM) of CuHARS revealed linear morphology and smooth surface texture. SEM, TEM and light microscopy showed that CuHARS composites had scalable dimensions from nano- to micro-, with diameters as low as 40 nm, lengths exceeding 150 microns, and average aspect ratios of 100.

Structure 

MOBs are composed of two major components: a metal ion or cluster of metal ions and a biological molecule.  Examples include CuHARS which contain copper as the metal ion and cystine as the biological molecule.  Another example includes the use of silver as the metal ion in combination with cystine. Cystine is the dimer form of the amino acid cysteine.  Cobalt has also been used in combination with cystine to form CoMOBs.  

When combined with copper to form CuHARS, the cystine may provide a linker function leading to a linear, high-aspect ratio structure that gives CuHARS its name:  copper high-aspect ratio structures.  In contrast to CuHARS, MOBs formed with silver and cystine, result in silver nanoparticles with spherical, rounded structure.  These have been named AgCysNPs.  Figure 1 shows comparative electron microscopy of CuHARS and AgCysNPs.

Synthesis 
Synthesis:  MOBs under reducing conditions using sodium hydroxide (NaOH), can be self-assembled at body temperature (37 degrees Celsius).  In the case of copper CuHARS, MOBs can be produced by transforming copper nanoparticles to provide the copper source, or by utilizing copper(II) sulfate.

Physical Characteristics 

CuHARS have been shown to completely degrade under physiological conditions (cell culture media at 37° C), even in the absence of cells; this is possibly due to the metal chelating properties of typical cell culture medias.  These may include the copper-binding properties of cerulosplasmin  and of albumin.  Additionally, CuHARS have been shown to polarize light using inverted microscopy.

Uses 
MOBs have been incorporated into composites including cellulose.  Additionally, MOBs composed of the copper-containing CuHARS have been shown to provide catalytic function to produce nitric oxide (NO); this production of NO was shown to impart anti-microbial activity.  Both copper- and silver-containing MOBs were shown to have anti-cancer effect on cells in vitro.

References 

Biomaterials
Metals
Copper compounds
Silver compounds
Nanoparticles
Cobalt compounds